John Joseph "Jodie" Whire (June 11, 1910 – February 9, 1983) was an American football fullback who played one season with the Philadelphia Eagles of the National Football League. He first enrolled at the University of Georgia before transferring to Jefferson University. He attended Albany High School in Albany, Georgia.

College career
Whire first played college football for the Georgia Bulldogs of the University of Georgia. Whire transferred to play for the Jefferson Rangers of Jefferson University, which was in Texas.

Professional career
Whire played in two games, starting one, for the Philadelphia Eagles in 1933.

References

External links
Just Sports Stats

1910 births
1983 deaths
American football fullbacks
American football linebackers
Georgia Bulldogs football players
Philadelphia Eagles players
Sportspeople from Albany, Georgia
Players of American football from Georgia (U.S. state)